Yvonne C. Sherman Tutt (May 3, 1930 – February 2, 2005 in Colorado Springs, CO) was an American figure skater.  She won the gold medal at the U.S. Figure Skating Championships twice in ladies' single skating and once in pair skating with Robert Swenning.  Sherman competed in both disciplines in the 1948 Winter Olympics.

After her competitive career ended, Sherman became a skating judge.  She was married to William Thayer Tutt, a prominent skating administrator and promoter from Colorado Springs.  Both Tutts were inducted into the United States Figure Skating Hall of Fame in 1991.

Results

Singles

Pairs
(with Swenning)

References

1930 births
American female single skaters
American female pair skaters
Olympic figure skaters of the United States
Figure skaters at the 1948 Winter Olympics
2005 deaths
World Figure Skating Championships medalists
20th-century American women
21st-century American women